W.K. Mutale Nalumango (born 1 January 1955) is a Zambian educator and politician. She currently serves as the 14th Vice President of Zambia, having been appointed to the position in August 2021. Nalumango is only the second woman to hold this position, which is considered one of the most significant political roles in the country.

Before entering politics, Nalumango worked as an educator and served as Vice-President of the Secondary Schools' Teachers Union of Zambia. She later resigned from her position to pursue a career in politics and was elected as a member of the National Assembly in 2001, representing the Kaputa Constituency on the ticket of the Movement for Multiparty Democracy (MMD).

Nalumango has held several prominent positions in Zambia's political landscape, including serving as Deputy Minister of Information and Deputy Speaker in Parliament. She was the first woman to hold the position of Deputy Speaker, a role in which she played a crucial role in shaping the country's legislative agenda.

Career 
Mutale, born in 1955, is a teacher by profession. She served as Secondary Schools’ Teachers Union of Zambia vice-president before entering politics in 2001 and was elected member of parliament for Kaputa in 2001 under the MMD. 

She also served as information and broadcasting minister under the Levy Mwanawasa's government. As information and broadcasting minister, her actions raised concerns on press freedom in Zambia after police raided Richard Sakala’s Omega TV following a letter written by then-solicitor general Sunday Nkonde in which he stated that the TV station was operating illegally and needed to be shut down. In her second term as member of parliament for Kaputa in 2006 she stood for deputy speaker of the National Assembly of Zambia and won unopposed, becoming the first ever female to hold that position. After the 2011 elections she lost her parliamentary seat to Maxas Ng'onga of PF. She then joined the UPND where she was appointed the party’s national chairwoman in 2013, a position she held until February 2021 when she became the vice president of the party.

References 

1955 births
Living people
21st-century Zambian women politicians
21st-century Zambian politicians
Movement for Multi-Party Democracy politicians
United Party for National Development politicians
Vice-presidents of Zambia
Women vice presidents